The 1985 Virginia Slims Ginny Championships was a women's tennis tournament played on indoor carpet courts at the Sandpiper Bay Resort in Port St. Lucie, Florida, in the United States that was part of the 1984 Virginia Slims World Championship Series. It was the second and last edition of the tournament and was held from January 2, 1985, through January 6, 1985. Catarina Lindqvist won the singles title.

Finals

Singles
 Catarina Lindqvist defeated  Terry Holladay 6–3, 6–1
 It was Lindqvist's 3rd singles title of the year and of her career.

Doubles
 Betsy Nagelsen /  Paula Smith defeated  Christiane Jolissaint /  Marcella Mesker 6–4, 6–1
 It was Nagelsen's 4th title of the year and the 15th of her career. It was Smith's 4th title of the year and the 12th of her career.

External links
 ITF tournament edition details
 Tournament advertisement

Ginny Championships
Ginny Championships
Tennis tournaments in the United States
Ginny Championships
1984 in American tennis